Chobham is a village in Surrey, England

Chobham may also refer to:
 Chobham Common, located near Chobham, Surrey, location of a British tank research centre
 Chobham armour, composite armour for tanks
 Chobham F.C., a former English football club (1905–2011)
 Chobham Academy, an academy in the East Village of Stratford, London
 Chobham Manor, a neighbourhood in Queen Elizabeth Olympic Park, London built 2012–2013

See also:
 Cobham (disambiguation)